The Addo Elephant National Park Marine Protected Area is a marine conservation area in Algoa Bay, adjacent to the Nelson Mandela Bay Metropolitan Municipality, near Gqeberha, previously  Port Elizabeth.

History
The MPA was proclaimed by the Minister of Environmental Affairs, in terms section 43 of the Marine Living Resources Act, 18 of 1998.

MPA established date: 2005

Mix of restricted and controlled zones. Consultation with commercial fishermen, divers and other members of the public.

Approved by Cabinet on Wednesday, 24 October 2018, and proclaimed on 23 May 2019.

The original section of the park was founded in 1931, in part due to the efforts of Sydney Skaife, in order to provide a sanctuary for the eleven remaining elephants in the area. The park has proved to be very successful and currently houses more than 600 elephants and a large number of other mammals.

Purpose

A marine protected area is defined by the IUCN as "A clearly defined geographical space, recognised, dedicated and managed, through legal or other effective means, to achieve the long-term conservation of nature with associated ecosystem services and cultural values".

The Addo MPA is focused on protecting economically important linefish like kob and white steenbras.

Extent
The MPA extends 80 km eastward from Coega harbour, with an area of 1200 km2, and includes the estuary of the Sundays river from S33°37.665’, E025°44.082’ to the mouth of the river. The MPA includes the seabed and the water above it.

Boundaries
The boundaries of the MPA are:
North-western boundary: S33°46.792', E25°43.273' to S33°48.167', E25°42.000'
Western boundary: S33°48.167', E25°42.000' to S33°52.500', E25°42.000'
Southern boundary: S33°52.500', E25°42.000' to S33°52.500', E26°31.772'
Eastern boundary: S33°52.500', E26°31.772' to S33°45.202', E26°31.772'
Northern boundary: S33°45.202', E26°31.772' to S33°46.792', E25°43.273' along the high-water mark, and S33°37.665', E25°44.082' in the estuary of the Sundays River.

Zonation
The MPA has a mix of restricted and controlled zones. Commercial fishermen, divers and other members of the public were consulted during the planning phase.

Restricted zones

Bird Island inshore and offshore restricted zone:
Northern boundary: S33°43.257’, E026°09.1636’ to S33°46.037’, E026°19.458’ along the high-water mark, then from S33°46.037’E026°19.458’ to S33°45.951’ E026°29.350’, 200 m seawards of the high-water mark.
Eastern boundary: S33°45.951’ E026°29.350’ to S33°52.500’, E026°29.350’
Southern boundary: S33°52.500’, E026°29.350’ to S33°52.500’, E026°10.000’
Western boundary: S33°52.500’, E026°10.000’ to S33°43.257’, E026°09.1636’

St. Croix Island offshore restricted zone:
Northern boundary: S33°46.792, E025°43.273’ to S33°43.325’, E025°51.607’, 200 m seawards of the high-water mark.
Eastern boundary: S33°43.325’, E025°51.607’ to S33°52.500’, E025°51.607’
Southern boundary: S33°52.500’, E025°51.607’ to S33°52.500’, E025°42.000’
Western boundary: S33°52.500’, E025°42.000’ to S33°48.167’, E025°42.000’
North-western boundary: S33°48.167’, E025°42.000’ to S33°46.792’, E025°43.273’

Sundays inshore restricted zone:
Northern boundary: S33°42.491’, E025°57.35’ to S33°43.257’, E026°09.1636’, along the high-water mark
Eastern boundary: S33°43.257’, E026°09.1636’ to S33°44.328’, E026°10.000’
Southern boundary: S33°44.328’, E026°10.000’ to S33°43.541’, E025°57.350’
Western boundary: S33°43.541’, E025°57.350’ to S33°42.491’, E025°57.35’

Sunday’s River estuary mouth restricted zone:
Northern boundary: S33°43.179’, E025°50.762’ to S33°43.048’, E025°51.447’
Eastern boundary: S33°43.048’, E025°51.447’ to S33°43.309’, E025°51.530’
Southern boundary: S33°43.309’, E025°51.530’ to S33°43.441’, E025°50.843’
Western boundary: S33°43.441’, E025°50.843’, to S33°43.179’, E025°50.762’

Sunday’s River estuary restricted zone:
The estuary below the high-water mark between S33°41.029’, E025°46.248’ at the "Koppies" and S33°37.665’, E025°44.082’

Controlled zones

Cannon Rocks inshore and offshore controlled zone:
Northern boundary: S33°45.951’, E026°29.350’ along the high-water mark to S33°45.202’, E026°31.772’ 
Eastern boundary: S33°45.202’, E026°31.772′ to S33°52.500’ E026°31.772’
Southern boundary: S33°52.500’, E026°31.772’ to S33°52.500’, E026°29.350’
Western boundary: S33°52.500’, R026°29.350’ to S33°45.951’ E026°29.350’

Cape Padrone inshore controlled zone: 
Northern boundary: From S33°46.037’, E026°19.458’ along the high-water mark to S33°45.951’, E026°29.350’
Southern boundary: a line 200m offshore of the northern boundary

Sundays inshore and offshore controlled zone:
Northern boundary: From S33°43.188’, E025°51.607’ along the high-water mark to S33°42.491’, E025°57.350’, then south to S33°43.541’, E025°57.350’, and then to S33°44.328’, E026°10.000’
Eastern boundary: S33°44.328’, E026°10.000′ to S33°52.500’, E026°10.000’
Southern boundary: S33°52.500’, E026°10.000’ to S33°52.500’, E025°51.607’
Western boundary: S33°52.500’, E025°51.607’ to S33°43.188’, E025°51.607’

Algoa Bay zone for sustainable aquaculture:
A zone within the Sundays inshore and offshore controlled zone,
Northern boundary: S33°45.3383’, E25°51.6075’ to S33°45.3383’, E25°52.88052’
Eastern boundary: S33°45.3383’, E25°52.88052’ to S33°48.07272’, E25°52.88052’
Southern boundary: S33°48.07272’, E25°52.88052’ to S33°48.0783’, E25°51.6075’
Western boundary: S33°48.0783’, E25°51.6075’ to S33°45.3383’, E25°51.6075’

Sundays inshore controlled zone:
Northern boundary: S33°46.792’, E025°43.273’ to S33°43.336’, E025°50.810’ along the high-water mark west of the Sundays River mouth, and S33°43.204’, E025°51.497’ to S33°43.188’, E025°51.607’ along the high-water mark east of the Sundays River mouth 
Southern boundary: a line 200m offshore of the northern boundary
There is a gap between S33°43.336’, E025°50.810’ and S33°43.204’, E025°51.497’ that is part of the Sundays River estuary mouth restricted zone.

Sunday’s River estuary controlled zone:
The estuary below the high-water mark, between the boundary of the Sundays River estuary mouth restricted zone and S33°41.029’, E025°46.248’, at the "Koppies".

Management
The marine protected areas of South Africa are the responsibility of the national government, which has management  agreements with a variety of MPA management authorities, in this case, South African National Parks (SANParks), which manages the MPA with funding from the SA Government through the Department of Environmental Affairs (DEA).

The Department of Agriculture, Forestry and Fisheries is responsible for issuing permits, quotas and law enforcement.

Use
Whale and dolphin watching ecotourism (Bottlenose dolphins, Orca and several whale species)
Scuba diving with permit in specified zones.
Recreational angling with permit in specified zones
Waterskiing and recreational boating in the estuary

Activities requiring a permit
A permit must be issued by the management authority for the following activities:
Scientific research and monitoring
White shark cage-diving
Salvage operations
Maintenance of legal underwater infrastructure
Underwater photography
Other activity authorized in terms of legislation

Fishing

Scuba diving
Scuba diving in the MPA is only allowed in the Marine Protected Area in the St Croix offshore restricted zone, the Cannon Rock inshore and offshore controlled zone and the Sundays inshore and offshore controlled zone. The diver must be in possession of a personal permit to dive in marine protected areas. Operating a scuba diving business in these zones requires the operator to have a permit for that purpose.

Named dive sites
Named dive sites in the MPA include:
Bird Island 
Brenton Island  and 
Evan’s Peak 
St Croix Island Scuba Trails

Prohibited activities

Geography

General topography

Algoa Bay is a maritime bay of the Indian Ocean in the Eastern Cape province of South Africa. The harbour city of Port Elizabeth is situated adjacent to the bay, and the Port of Ngqura deep water port facility is on the north shore.

Islands
The bay contains six named islands in two groups of three that according to BirdLife International “are of considerable importance as they are the only islands along a  stretch of coastline between Cape Agulhas and Inhaca Island in Mozambique." The combined surface area of these islands is said to be .

Close inshore, near the new Ngquru harbour development at Coega, on the north-eastern outskirts of Port Elizabeth, is the St Croix group, consisting of a main island of that name and two lesser islets, Jahleel Island just off the Ngqurha breakwater and Brenton Island on the seaward side. The second group consists of Bird, Seal and Stag Islands. All six islands and their adjacent waters are declared nature reserves and form part of the Addo Elephant National Park. The islands are closed to the public.

St. Croix group

The island is rocky and has very little vegetation. The highest point is halfway along the north coast.
Jahleel is about the same size as Brenton and has a north-south axis.

Bird Island group
Vasco da Gama named this group of islands Ilhéus Chãos (low or flat islands).  In 1755, the East Indiaman Doddington was wrecked here while underway from Dover to India.  Bird Island was named by the survivors as they left the island in their boat.

Bird Island has a lighthouse, erected in 1898 after a series of shipwrecks in the vicinity of the island. Doddington Rock, West rock and East Reef lie just southwest of the group of islands.

At , Bird Island is the largest of the Algoa Bay islands. The islands are sparsely covered by mixed vegetation dominated by Mesembryanthemum. Tetragonia (Duneweed) and Chenopodium (Goosefoot) provide some cover for seabirdss.

Geology

Hydrography
Currents, waves and swell.

Bathymetry

Climate

Under the Köppen climate classification, the city of Port Elizabeth has an oceanic climate (Cfb). The area lies between the winter rainfall, Mediterranean climate zones of the Western Cape and the summer rainfall regions of eastern South Africa. Winters are cool but mild and summers are warm but considerably less humid and hot than more northerly parts of South Africa's east coast. The climate is very even throughout the year with extreme heat or moderate cold rare.

Seasonal variations in sea conditions

Ecology

Rocky shores, sandy shores, offshore reef, soft marine sediments and estuaries are all represented in the MPA.

The MPA is in the warm temperate Agulhas inshore marine ecoregion to the east of Cape Point which extends eastwards to the Mbashe River. There are a large proportion of species endemic to South Africa along this coastline.

Three major habitats exist in the sea in this region, distinguished by the nature of the substrate. The substrate, or base material, is important in that it provides a base to which an organism can anchor itself, which is vitally important for those organisms which need to stay in one particular kind of place. Rocky shores and reefs provide a firm fixed substrate for the attachment of plants and animals. Sandy beaches and sediment bottoms are a relatively unstable substrate and cannot anchor many of the benthic organisms. Finally there is open water, above the substrate and clear of the sessile biota, where the organisms must drift or swim. Mixed habitats are also frequently found, which are a combination of those mentioned above.

Rocky shores and reefs
There are rocky reefs and mixed rocky and sandy bottoms. For many marine organisms the substrate is another type of marine organism, and it is common for several layers to co-exist. Examples of this are red bait pods, which are usually encrusted with sponges, ascidians, bryozoans, anemones, and gastropods, and abalone, which are usually covered by similar seaweeds to those found on the surrounding rocks, usually with a variety of other organisms living on the seaweeds.

The type of rock of the reef is of some importance, as it influences the range of possibilities for the local topography, which in turn influences the range of habitats provided, and therefore the diversity of inhabitants. Sandstone and other sedimentary rocks erode and weather very differently, and depending on the direction of dip and strike, and steepness of the dip, may produce reefs which are relatively flat to very high profile and full of small crevices. These features may be at varying angles to the shoreline and wave fronts. There are fewer large holes, tunnels and crevices in sandstone reefs, but often many deep but low near-horizontal crevices.

Sandy beaches and unconsolidated sedimentary bottoms (including silt, mud, sand, shelly, pebble and gravel bottoms)
Loose sediment bottoms at first glance appear to be fairly barren areas, as they lack the stability to support many of the spectacular reef based species, and the variety of large organisms is relatively low. The sediment is continually being moved around by wave action, to a greater or lesser degree depending on weather conditions and exposure of the area. This means that sessile organisms must be specifically adapted to areas of relatively loose substrate to thrive in them, and the variety of species found on a sandy or gravel bottom will depend on all these factors. Loose sedimentary bottoms have one important compensation for their instability, animals can burrow into the sediment and move up and down within its layers, which can provide feeding opportunities and protection from predation. Other species can dig themselves holes in which to shelter, or may feed by filtering water drawn through the tunnel, or by extending body parts adapted to this function into the water above the sediment.

The open sea

Marine species diversity

Animals
Species protected by this MPA:

Mammals:
Cape fur seals Arctocephalus pusillus pusillus (breeding colony)
Southern right whale Eubalaena australis
Brydes whale
Minke whale
Humpback whale
Birds:
Cape gannets Morus capensis (breeding colony, feeding area)
African penguins Spheniscus demersus (breeding colony, feeding area)
Roseate terns. Sterna dougallii

Fish:
Great white shark Carcharodon carcharias
Kob (kabeljou) Argyrosomus spp.

Invertebrates:
Abalone (perlemoen) Haliotis midae

Seaweeds

Endemism
The MPA is in the warm temperate Agulhas inshore marine bioregion to the east of Cape Point which extends eastwards to the Mbashe River. There are a large proportion of species endemic to South Africa along this coastline. Nelson Mandela Bay has the largest proportion of endemic marine invertebrates and seaweeds on the South African coastline.

Alien invasive species

Threats

Slipways and harbours in the MPA

See also

References

Marine protected areas of South Africa
Marine biodiversity of South Africa